STUCCO Housing Co-operative is a student housing co-operative in Sydney, Australia. Officially opened on the 21st of February, 1992, it was the first of its kind in Australia, though there is now also the Canberra Student Housing Cooperative. Its name is a contraction of "Student Co-operative" rather than a reference to the rendered coatings on the external brickwork in the STUCCO building.

History
The Co-operative is located on the heritage-listed former F. W. Gissing glass factory at 197-207 Wilson Street Newtown, New South Wales. While adaptively reused as student housing, the building retains its architectural integrity as a recognisable former factory. With its surviving Federation and inter-war features, industrial character, consistent building form of brick bays and parapet walls and three street frontages, the building makes an important contribution to surrounding streetscapes. The building is a distinctive feature of Wilson Street, which is visible from a number of near and distant vantage points.

It is a 40-member Housing Co-operative made up of both undergraduate and postgraduate full-time students of the University of Sydney who hold Australian citizenship. Stucco regularly holds charity events such as art exhibitions, live music performances, discussion groups, and parties. Stucco also allows community groups to utilise the space for their own events and has had the pleasure of hosting groups such as The Beautiful Minds Project, the Solidarity Choir, and Adventure Time. Stucco has been able to support political organisations such as Refugee Action Coalition and the Redfern Tent Embassy, utilising its resources and space to benefit the community.

Stucco Solar Project

In 2015, the City of Sydney Council afforded Stucco an "Environmental Performance Innovation Grant" to help Stucco create the first multi-unit residence to achieve a unified solar panel and battery network in Australia.

The solar system is a test case and demonstration of solar–photovoltaic and battery storage installation in the context of multi-unit residences. The system holds 114 panels and 36 batteries, producing 30 kWh with storage capacity for 42.3 kW.

The project was managed by Louis Janse van Rensburg and Bjorn Sturmberg, both former residents of Stucco, with media and publicity handled by Sarah King (2016 President of Stucco).

References

External links
Official website
Official Tully fanclub site
1/6 Celebrations
"Co-operative housing, more bang for your buck"
STUCCO and the 30A Creative Workshop
"$215 a week to live on a balcony"

Student housing cooperatives
Residential buildings in Australia